Pan Tau (Czech for "Mr. Tau") is a character created for a children's television series. There were 33 episodes in 3 series made by the Czechoslovak Television (ČST) in cooperation with Barrandov Studios and the West German TV network Westdeutscher Rundfunk (WDR). A pilot film was shot in 1966, and 33 episodes were made from 1970 until 1979. The project ended with a feature film in 1988.

The protagonist Pan Tau, who generally didn't speak and communicated through pantomime, was played by Otto Šimánek (1925–1992). The series was written by Ota Hofman and directed by Jindřich Polák. The stories were generally funny but contained some kind of problem for a child, and here Pan Tau found the way to solve the problem.

Pan Tau always had a gentle expression and a friendly smile, he was elegantly dressed in a stroller, with an umbrella and a white carnation in the lapel. Foremost, he was famous for his magic bowler hat. By tapping on his hat, Pan Tau was able to change his appearance into a puppet, to conjure up miscellaneous objects or to do other magic. His most characteristic behaviour is that he would help children who were experiencing some sort of difficulties in-between their dreams and reality, like finding a place for skiing, settling family problems on Christmas, and even give a boy a good time at a fair when he is supposed to have piano lessons. To adults, he usually remained invisible.

Although Czechoslovakia then was under a Communist regime, this never was very obvious for the viewers. And Pan Tau was a popular children program in several countries at both sides of the Iron Curtain (such as in both West and East Germany and also in the Scandinavian countries), which also appealed to the adult parents in a certain degree.

Theodor Pištěk designed the costumes for the series.

Ten years after the end of the series, Šimánek again appeared as Pan Tau in a 1988 cinema film. He was also featured in Nena's 1990 music video for Du bist überall ("You Are Everywhere", from the Wunder gescheh'n studio album), which was shot in Prague.

Series overview

Pan Tau and First Adventure

Plot summary
Pan Tau makes his first appearance helping a young boy, who is reluctantly attending piano lessons, to overcome his boredom.

Cast
Otto Šimánek - Pan Tau
Václav Štekl - pianist teacher
Vladimír Horka - pianist

First series

Plot summary

Cast
Otto Šimánek - Pan Tau
Josef Filip - Emil
František Filipovský - Shop Owner
Jiří Sovák - Emil's Father
Slávka Budínová - Emil's Mother
Josef Bevyl - Emil's Grandfather
Blanka Krátká - Emil's Sister
Veronika Renčová - Claudie
Jan Werich - Claudie's Grandfather
Věra Ferbasová, Věra Tichánková - Claudie's Educators
Pavel Landovský - Taxi driver
Václav Štekl - teacher
Vladimír Hlavatý - School director
Miroslav Homola - School inspektor
Miloš Kopecký - Owner of losses and finds
Václav Trégl - traveler
Karel Effa - A migrator
Milan Neděla - A migrator
Stanislav Fišer - A migrator
Václav Kotva - A migrator
Jan Libíček - Publican
Viktor Maurer - Hunter
Václav Neckář - Television repairer

Second Series

Plot summary
Pan Tau meets dysfunctional family Urban and decides to bring back Alfonz, Father Urban's brother (and a dead lookalike of Pan Tau), from a lonely island Alfonz has fled to in his adventurous youth for a Robinson-like life.

Cast
Otto Šimánek - Pan Tau, Alfonz Urban
Jiřina Bohdalová - Mother Urban
Vladimír Menšík - Father Urban
František Filipovský - Grandfather Urban
František Peterka - Neighbor
Magda Křížková / Šebestová - Kateřina Urban
Gustav Bubník - Rudolf Urban
Karel Augusta - Secret policeman
Svatopluk Beneš - Grandfather's brother 
Josef Somr - Petr Kalina / Doctor Azor
Zdeněk Dítě - uncle Lojzík
Eugen Jegorov - Father Kudrna
Jiří Kúkol, J. Krafka - Adopted sons
Jaroslav Štercl - Porter
František Kovářík - Lecturer
Jiří Vondráček - Martin (Kateřina Love)
Jiří Hrzán - Mafia
Jiří Vala - Mafia
Bohuml Šmída - Mafia
Josef Bláha - Mafia
Jindřich Narenta - An employee of the weather institute
Josef Kemr - An employee of the weather institute
Václav Štekl - An employee of the weather institute
Ladislav Potměšil - Driving school teacher
Jana Hlaváčová - Teacher / later Alfonso's wife

Third Series

Plot summary

Cast
Otto Šimánek - Pan Tau
Vlastimil Brodský - 3. air traffic inspector Málek
Josef Bláha - 1. air traffic inspector Kučera
Jiří Kodet - Pilot
Jiří Lábus - Dispatcher
Petr Nárožný - Alenka's Father
Michael Hofbauer - Otík Málek
Zdena Hadrbolcová - Málek's wife
Josef Dvořák - Transport for safari Jan Kalous
Zdeněk Srstka - Transport for safari
Lenka Termerová - Kalous's wife
František Husák - Pilot powdering aircraft
Robert Vrchota - Agronomist
Jana Brejchová - Wizard Stella
Mahulena Bočanová - Her daughter
Vladimír Hrubý - Wizard Brehm from Berhm
Petr Čepek - Wizard Orlando
Václav Štekl - Organizer of the magical festival
Antonín (strýček) Jedlička - Backdrop
Marie Rosůlková - Grandmother
Václav Lohniský - Cook Hurta 
Helena Růžičková - Cook from the camp near the creek
Jan Skopeček - Driver with meat (Mirek's father)
Karel Augusta - Drafts
Josef Kemr - Grandfather Hanousek
Tomáš Vacek - Mirek
Julie Jurištová - Terezka / the lead of girls in the pioneer camp
Jan Sedláček - Láďa / the lead of boys in the pioneer camp

Episodes
Pan Tau a první dobrodružství - Pan Tau and first adventure

First series
Pan Tau přichází - Pan Tau is coming
Pan Tau naděluje - Pan Tau gives gifts
Pan Tau na horách - Pan Tau in the mountains
Pan Tau a neděle - Pan Tau Sunday
Pan Tau jde do školy - Pan Tau go to school
Pan Tau a samá voda - Pan Tau and much water.
Pan Tau a Claudie - Pan Tau and Claudie
Pan Tau to zařídí - Pan Tau will arrange it
Pan Tau a cesta kolem světa - Pan Tau and journey around the world
Pan Tau v cirkusu - Pan Tau in circus
Hledá se pan Tau - looking for Pan Tau
Pan Tau a tisíc kouzel - Pan Tau and a thousand spells

Second series
Pan Tau se vrací - Pan Tau is coming back
Pan Tau a robinson - Pan Tau and robinson
Pan Tau a příliš velký balón - Pan Tau and too big balloon
Pan Tau a pes kozopes - Pan Tau and Dog Goat-Dog
Pan Tau a rodinná slavnost - Pan Tau and Family festival
Pan Tau jde do práce - Pan Tau go to work
Pan Tau pět hrušek a tři jablka - Pan Tau five pear's and Three apple's
Pan Tau a černý deštiník - Pan Tau and black umbrella
Pan Tau a Velký Ples - Pan Tau and big festival
Pan Tau a rosnička - Pan Tau and frog
Pan Tau  Aladinova lampa - Pan Tau and Aladin's Lamp
Pan Tau a zlatý kufr - Pan Tau and gold suitcase
Pan Tau odchází - Pan Tau leaving

Third Series
Poplach v oblacích - Alarm in the clouds
Lov na Slona - Elephant hunting
Noc v safari - Night in safari
Pan Tau a kouzelnice - Pan Tau and sorceress
Pan Tau na pionýrském táboře - Pan Tau on the pioneer camp
A která je ta pravá - And which is the right one?
Od zítřka nečaruji - From tomorrow I'm so not using magic

Third Series (7 episodes) was cut into two films - Poplach v oblacích (Czech - Alarm in the clouds, 1 - 3 episodes and episode 4 miss) and Od zítřka nečaruji (From tomorrow I'm so not using magic, 5 - 7 episodes)

Trivia
In 1970, a then unknown Ivana Marie Zelníčková (later Ivana Trump) appeared on Pan Tau in Season 1, Episode 3 "Pan Tau na horách" (Pan Tau in the mountains).

References

External links 
 Pan Tau photo on the website of Radio Praha
  (Internet Movie Database)
 About the series at the Cesko-Slovenská filmová databàze

Children's television characters
Czech children's television series
1970 Czechoslovak television series debuts
1979 Czechoslovak television series endings
1970s Czechoslovak television series
Czech fantasy television series